Tamarine Tanasugarn (born 24 May 1977) is a Thai former tennis player. Born in Los Angeles, she turned professional in 1994, and has been in the top 20 in both singles and doubles.

Tanasugarn's career-high WTA ranking is No. 19, achieved on 13 May 2002, which is the highest ranking ever achieved of a Thai female player. She won four singles and eight WTA doubles titles, and was briefly a doubles partner with Maria Sharapova, with whom she won two titles in 2003. Her career-high doubles ranking was 15, which she achieved on 13 September 2004. With Liezel Huber, she reached the 2004 US Open doubles quarterfinals, and at the 2011 Wimbledon Championships, she reached the women's doubles semifinal with Marina Erakovic. Her biggest success came in 2008, when she reached the singles quarterfinals at Wimbledon.

In her career, Tanasugarn has defeated former and current No. 1 players, including Amélie Mauresmo, Jennifer Capriati, Jelena Janković, Dinara Safina and Simona Halep. She has also beaten French Open champion Iva Majoli.

Tanasugarn has been regarded as a grass-court specialist; she won most matches on that surface including two WTA International titles. Tanasugarn at some point held the record of the most singles matches won on grass court among active players. As of 8 July 2013, she was second (with 84 wins) among active players, and 12th on the all-time list.

Tanasugarn has also been a regular competitor for the Thailand Fed Cup team, helping the team join the World Group II in 2005 and 2006, after beating the teams of Australia and Croatia in their play-off matches.

She received a law degree from Bangkok University in 2000.

Playing style
Tanasugarn produces her best game and strategy when she performs on grass. She is also known for her accurate flat ground strokes and a heavy slice serve for which are particularly effective on grass, Venus Williams has given an interview regarding Tanasugarn's game after their quarterfinal match in 2008 Wimbledon Championships: "I think her game is really suited for the grass. Her serve is a slice that turns into you and it stays low. Her shots are really, really low to the ground. A lot of time I think I was battling just to stay down on the shots, and I felt good when I got one up in my strike zone". Kim Clijsters has once described Tanasugarn as a "tricky player". Tanasugarn's weakness has always been her serve.

Tanasugarn was coached by her best friend, Andreea Ehritt-Vanc, until her retirement.

Career

Junior
During her junior career, her expenses were provided by her father, Virachai Tanasugarn, a lawyer who was once a Thai basketball player and who inspired Tanasugarn to become a professional tennis player. At 17, she reached the Junior Grand Slam final at Wimbledon in 1995 with a win over Anna Kournikova in the semifinal, but lost to Poland's Aleksandra Olsza in the final, in straight sets.

1994–1999
Tanasugarn turned pro in 1994, but made her WTA Tour debut in the 1993 Pattaya Open, in which she lost to Australian Rennae Stubbs. The following year, she made the second round in the same tournament by beating world No. 44, Marianne Werdel Witmeyer, in the first round. In 1995, Tanasugarn started participating in Grand Slams, but did not make it beyond the qualifying rounds. In 1996, Tanasugarn played her first WTA final at the Pattaya Open, in which she lost to Ruxandra Dragomir. In 1997, she reached the third round of the Australian Open, at Wimbledon and the US Open, beating Chanda Rubin in the first round. She reached a semifinal at Hobart and ended the year with a No. 46 ranking.

1998, Tanasugarn reached the fourth round of a Grand Slam at the Australian Open by defeating the reigning French Open champion and world No. 6, Iva Majoli, 6–0, 6–2 in the third round. Tanasugarn also made her second fourth round of the year at Wimbledon, where she eventually lost to Martina Hingis. In 1999, she reached the fourth round at Wimbledon for a second time by defeating Frenchwoman Sandrine Testud, in the third round. Tanasugarn ended the year ranked No. 72.

2000–2004
She partnered with Paradorn Srichaphan at the Hopman Cup in 2000. Tanasugarn beat Jelena Dokić of Australia, Barbara Schett of Austria, Ai Sugiyama of Japan, and Henrieta Nagyová of Slovakia. However, Tanasugarn lost in the women's singles final to Amanda Coetzer of South Africa, 6–3, 4–6, 4–6, having led 6–3, 3–0. In the men's singles final, Paradorn Srichaphan lost to Wayne Ferreira, 6–7, 3–6. This result made them the first Asian team to reach the finals at the Hopman Cup. Tanasugarn reached her second WTA final at Birmingham with a win over Julie Halard-Decugis, but lost to Lisa Raymond. She also lost in the fourth round at Wimbledon to Serena Williams. Tanasugarn reached three semifinals at the Japan Open, Kuala Lampur, and Shanghai. She represented Thailand in the 2000 Summer Olympics, but was defeated by Venus Williams. Her year-end ranking was No. 29, her first time in the top 30.

In 2001, Tanasugarn had her second and third top-ten wins against Nathalie Tauziat at Eastbourne and Amélie Mauresmo at Wimbledon and reached her third career final at Japan Open, losing to Monica Seles, 3–6, 2–6. At the end of the season, Tanasugarn was ranked in the top 30.

In 2002, she achieved her best ranking by reaching the fourth and fifth major finals at Canberra, losing to Anna Smashnova, and at Doha, losing to Monica Seles, and the quarterfinals at the Toray Pan Pacific Open. On 13 May, Tanasugarn was ranked No. 19 in the world, her best career ranking to date. She ended the year ranked No. 28.

In 2003, Tanasugarn won her first major in Hyderabad where she beat Maria Kirilenko in the quarterfinals, then Flavia Pennetta in the semifinals, and Iroda Tulyaganova in the final. Tanasugarn reached her second Tier I quarterfinal at the Pan Pacific Open, beating Silvia Farina Elia, but lost to Lindsay Davenport, in two sets. Tanasugarn suffered her earliest exit at Wimbledon since she turned pro, losing to Akiko Morigami in the first round. She reached the fourth round at the US Open for the first time, beating Rita Grande, Patty Schnyder, and ninth seed Daniela Hantuchová. Tanasugarn lost to Amélie Mauresmo in two sets in the following round. She was ranked No. 34 at the end of the year.

In 2004, she reached her sixth fourth round at Wimbledon, although she lost to Ai Sugiyama in two sets. Tanasugarn was also a semifinalist in the Japan Open Tennis Championships, losing to Maria Sharapova.

2005–2007
Tanasugarn had to deal with multiple injuries, which affected most of her year in 2005. Her ranking dropped out of the top 100, and she played in Challenger-level tournaments to collect points.

In 2006, she once mentioned retiring from tennis, but, after she qualified to play in the main draw of Wimbledon and reached the third round, she decided to give it another shot. Tanasugarn reached her home country tournament final again in the Bangkok Open, facing Vania King, and was two games away from taking the title. Leading in the final set 4–2, King fought back to win the match. Despite losing the match, Tanasugarn regained some confidence to get back to the tour. She finished that year ranked No. 75.

Unfortunately, Tanasugarn still struggled with injuries in 2007 and had to play in many Challengers, ending the season ranked No. 124.

2008–2009
She made a successful comeback in 2008. Tanasugarn decided to skip the clay-court season due to her difficulty playing on that surface and chose to play in hardcourt Challengers, she thought were more like grass. Tanasugarn won the singles title at the Kangaroo Cup in Gifu, defeating former world No. 4, Kimiko Date-Krumm.

In the grass-court season, Tanasugarn beat the Austrian Tamira Paszek in Birmingham, but lost to Bethanie Mattek in the fourth round. A week later, Tanasugarn stunned many tennis fans at the Ordina Open when, ranked No. 85, she beat Kateryna Bondarenko, Ashley Harkleroad, Michaëlla Krajicek, and Alona Bondarenko to reach her eighth major final, beating the French Open runner-up Dinara Safina in two sets. She reached her seventh fourth round at Wimbledon, beating Petra Cetkovská, Vera Zvonareva and Marina Erakovic en route, and surprised the world No. 3, Jelena Janković, with a two-set defeat in the fourth round. Despite making her Grand Slam quarterfinal debut, she lost to the eventual champion Venus Williams, in straight sets. Tanasugarn became the first Thai player to make a Grand Slam quarterfinal. She ended 2008 ranked No. 35, her best ranking in four years.

Tanasugarn was seeded 32nd in the 2009 Australian, Open, but lost early to María José Martínez Sánchez. She played in the Fed Cup for Thailand, losing to Samantha Stosur, leaving Thailand in third place in the Asia/Oceania group, after Australia and New Zealand. Tanasugarn lost to Sania Mirza in straight sets in the quarterfinals of the Pattaya Women's Open. In doubles, she partnered Yaroslava Shvedova, and the team, seeded second, got into the final and won the match, beating Yuliya Beygelzimer and Vitalia Diatchenko.

At the French Open, Tanasugarn defeated Camille Pin, in the first round. In the second, she was easily beaten by eighth seed and defending champion, Ana Ivanovic.

Tanasugarn started playing on grass courts at the Birmingham Classic. In the first round, she defeated Julie Coin in straight sets. In the second round, Tanasugarn spent 2 hours 23 minutes on court, eventually losing to home favourite Naomi Cavaday in three sets. In 's-Hertogenbosch, as defending champion, she defeated Barbora Záhlavová-Strýcová and seventh seeded Iveta Benešová to reach the quarterfinals. There, she recovered from a set down to defeat third seeded Flavia Pennetta. In the semifinals, Tanasugarn defeated Dinara Safina, in straight sets. It was her first career win over a reigning world No. 1. In the final, she beat Yanina Wickmayer to successfully defend her title.

At Wimbledon, Tanasugarn had an arm injury and lost to Arantxa Parra Santonja in the first round. She played the mixed-doubles event for the first time, partnering with Rogier Wassen, but she scratched in the second round because of her injury.

Tanasugarn came back after her arm injury at the US Open, but lost to Anastasija Sevastova in the first round.

2010–2015
Tanasugarn started the year by playing at the Australian Open. She won her first Grand Slam first-round match in five years, with a 6–1, 7–6 victory over Sesil Karatantcheva, but lost to Kim Clijsters in the second round. At the Pattaya Open, Tanasugarn worked her way past Alla Kudryavtseva, second seed Sabine Lisicki, Anna Chakvetadze, and Sesil Karatantcheva. She finally lost to top seed and defending champion, Vera Zvonareva, in a dramatic final.

Tanasugarn and her New Zealand partner Marina Erakovic won the Pattaya Open doubles title, beating Anna Chakvetadze and Ksenia Pervak, giving Tanasugarn a successful defence of her homeland doubles title. Her next scheduled tournament was the Malaysian Open, where she lost to seventh seed Magdaléna Rybáriková in the first round. At the American fortnight tours, she entered the main draw in Indian Wells as a lucky loser and advanced into the second round, before losing to 19th seed Aravane Rezaï. In Miami, she lost to Pauline Parmentier in the final qualifying round. She also played several ITF tournaments in April, reaching the finals in Johannesburg.

After the middle of April, Tanasugarn did not play any tournaments and withdrew in Strasbourg due to an elbow injury. At Roland-Garros, she lost to Daniela Hantuchová in the first round. Tanasugarn began playing her favourite surface, grass, at the Birmingham Classic, surviving into the second round against Sania Mirza, after Mirza failed to serve out the match at 5–4 and 30–0. She lost to Yanina Wickmayer in the next round, in straight sets. She then competed at Rosmalen, but was defeated in the first round. Tanasugarn also suffered a first-round loss at Wimbledon and missed the US Open due to injuries. She won her fourth WTA title at Osaka, defeating Marion Bartoli en route, and Kimiko Date-Krumm in the final.

Despite losing in qualifying stages of 2011 Wimbledon with her partner Marina Erakovic, the doubles team received a lucky loser berth into the main draw and advanced to the semifinals with a 4–6, 7–6, 13–11 victory over third seeds Lisa Raymond and Liezel Huber. It was the first time that Tanasugarn (as well as Erakovic) had advanced to the semifinals of a Grand Slam event in any capacity.

In late March 2015, Tanasugarn defeated Sofia Shapatava in the first qualifying round of the Open GdF Suez; this would be the final singles win of her professional career. In late April, she lost to Kristýna Plíšková in the first round of the Kangaroo Cup; this would turn out to be the final singles match of her career.

2016–present: retirement & comeback in doubles
She announced her retirement from professional tennis in June 2016.

Tanasugarn then regularly played doubles in small ITF tournaments around Thailand and nearby areas, winning the final of the $25k Hua Hin tournament in November 2019, partnering Lesley Pattinama Kerkhove. Since February 2020 she was inactive again.

Performance timelines
Only main-draw results in WTA Tour, Grand Slam tournaments, Fed Cup and Olympic Games are included in win–loss records.

Singles

Doubles

Significant finals

Premier Mandatory & Premier 5 finals

Doubles: 1 (runner-up)

WTA career finals

Singles: 11 (4 titles, 7 runner-ups)

Doubles: 16 (8 titles, 8 runner-ups)

ITF Circuit finals

Singles: 24 (15 titles, 9 runner-ups)

Doubles: 17 (8 titles, 9 runner-ups)

Top 10 wins

Notes

References

External links

 
 
 

1977 births
Living people
Tamarine Tanasugarn
Tamarine Tanasugarn
Tamarine Tanasugarn
Tennis players from Los Angeles
Tennis players at the 1996 Summer Olympics
Tennis players at the 2000 Summer Olympics
Tennis players at the 2004 Summer Olympics
Tennis players at the 2008 Summer Olympics
Tamarine Tanasugarn
Hopman Cup competitors
Asian Games medalists in tennis
Tennis players at the 1994 Asian Games
Tennis players at the 1998 Asian Games
Tennis players at the 2002 Asian Games
Tennis players at the 2006 Asian Games
Tennis players at the 2010 Asian Games
Tennis players at the 2014 Asian Games
Tamarine Tanasugarn
Tamarine Tanasugarn
Tamarine Tanasugarn
Medalists at the 1998 Asian Games
Medalists at the 2002 Asian Games
Medalists at the 2010 Asian Games
Medalists at the 2014 Asian Games
Tamarine Tanasugarn
Tamarine Tanasugarn
Tamarine Tanasugarn
Southeast Asian Games medalists in tennis
Tamarine Tanasugarn
Competitors at the 2007 Southeast Asian Games
Competitors at the 2009 Southeast Asian Games
Competitors at the 2019 Southeast Asian Games
Tamarine Tanasugarn